Erhard Grundl (born 7 January 1963) is a German politician of the Alliance 90/The Greens who has been serving as a member of the Bundestag from the state of Bavaria since 2017.

Early life and career 
After attending the Burkhart-Gymnasium in Mallersdorf-Pfaffenberg and the Staatliche Fachoberschule Straubing, Grundl began studying social education at the Fachhochschule Regensburg in 1985, which he left without graduating in 1987. From 1987 to 1997 he was a member of the rock band "Baby You Know" and from 1991 to 2017 he worked as a sales manager in the music industry.

Political career 
Grundl first became a member of the Bundestag in the 2017 German federal election. In parliament, he is a member of the Committee on Culture and the Media and spokesman for his group on cultural policy. He is also a member of the Sports Committee.

Other activities 
 German Federal Cultural Foundation, Member of the Board of Trustees
 Memorial to the Murdered Jews of Europe Foundation, Member of the Board of Trustees (since 2022) 
 Tarabya Cultural Academy, Member of the Advisory Board (since 2022)
 Haus der Geschichte, Member of the Board of Trustees (2020–2022)
 German United Services Trade Union (ver.di), Member

References

External links 

  
 Bundestag biography 
 

 

1963 births
Living people
Members of the Bundestag for Bavaria
Members of the Bundestag 2021–2025
Members of the Bundestag 2017–2021
Members of the Bundestag for Alliance 90/The Greens
People from Straubing-Bogen